Egloff is a surname shared by several notable people:
 Ron Egloff (born 1955), former American professional football player
 Georg Brandl Egloff (born 1963), American musician
 Gustav Egloff (1886-1955) American chemist and Director of UOP
 Bruce Egloff (born 1965), former American professional baseball player
 Rick Egloff (living), American-Canadian professional football player

Swiss-language surnames
Swiss-German surnames
Surnames from given names
Germanic-language surnames